The Army Cross for 1813/14, also called the Cannon Cross, was created on 13 May 1814 by Emperor Franz I of Austria and could be awarded to all soldiers who took part in the wars of liberation against Napoleon.

Army Cross for 1813/14

Appearance 
The decoration is a paw cross made of bronze captured French guns with a laurel wreath running between the arms of the cross. On the arms of the cross from top to bottom the inscription GRATI PRINCEPS ET PATRIA FRANC · IMP · AUG · (In gratitude ruler and fatherland Emperor Franz). Back EUROPAE LIBERTATE ASSERTA MDCCCXIII/MDCCCXIV · (Those who ensured Europe's freedom 1813/1814).

The Army Cross was the first military mass award in the Habsburg Monarchy.  During the First World War, the appearance of this decoration served as a model for the design of the Karl Troop Cross, newly created in December 1916.

Wearing 
The award was worn on a yellow ribbon with a black wide border stripe on the left side of the chest.

Awards 
On 18 October 1814, Field Marshal Karl Philipp, Prince of Schwarzenberg as commander-in-chief of the allied troops, was awarded the Grand Army Cross made of gold for 1813/14 by the Emperor. This honour is distinctively worn around the neck and can be seen in most Portraits of Karl Philip, Prince of Schwarzenberg.

In total, the award was presented about 100,000 times.

See also 

 List of Austrian orders and decorations

Literature 

 Johann Stolzer, Christian Steeb: Österreichs Orden vom Mittelalter bis zur Gegenwart. Akademische Druck- und Verlagsanstalt Graz, ISBN 3-201-01649-7.

References 

 ^ Heeresgeschichtliches Museum (Hrsg.): Das Heeresgeschichtliche Museum im Wiener Arsenal. Verlag Militaria, Vienna 2016, ISBN 978-3-902551-69-6, p. 65.

External links 
Wikimedia Commons has media related to: Army Cross for 1813/14
Categories:

 Historical Military Award (Austria)
 Orders and Decorations (Coalition Wars)

Medals
1814 in the Austrian Empire
Napoleonic Wars